Momdau is a village located in the Jaisalmer district of the state of Rajasthan in northern India. The village falls under Jaisalmer Tehsil. The village is administered by a Sarpanch, in accordance with the Panchayati Raj Act.

Population 
According to the 2011 Census, there are only 10 males and 5 females in the village, in a total of 3 houses. Meaning the total population is 15 with an average of 5 people per family.

References 

Villages in Jaisalmer district